Lene Stokholm Demsitz (Humlebæk) (Jørgensen)  (born 8 March 1959 in Rønde, Midtjylland) is a retired female long jumper from Denmark. Her personal best jump was 6.72 metres, achieved in August 1985 in Budapest. She is also a two-time national champion (1984 and 1985) in the women's high jump.

Achievements

References

External links
sports-reference

Profile

1959 births
Living people
Danish female high jumpers
Danish female long jumpers
Athletes (track and field) at the 1988 Summer Olympics
Olympic athletes of Denmark
People from Syddjurs Municipality
Sportspeople from the Central Denmark Region